Ruth Hurtado Olave (born 1982) is a Chilean politician who was elected as a member of the Chilean Constitutional Convention.

In December 2021, she served as spokeswoman of José Antonio Kast's candidacy in the ballotage of the 2021 Chilean general election.

References

External links
 

Living people
1982 births
21st-century Chilean politicians
Members of the Chilean Constitutional Convention
21st-century Chilean women politicians